Williams-Ball-Copeland House, also known as the Franks House, The Villa, Hampton Heights, and Baptist Retirement Center, is a historic home located at Laurens, Laurens County, South Carolina. It was built about 1859-1861 as a summer residence.  It is a two-story, Italianate style brick residence with a stuccoed and scored exterior.  Also on the property are two, small, brick outbuildings; originally the summer kitchen and the other was a combination smokehouse and food storage house.

It was added to the National Register of Historic Places in 1986.

References 

Houses on the National Register of Historic Places in South Carolina
Italianate architecture in South Carolina
Houses completed in 1861
Houses in Laurens County, South Carolina
National Register of Historic Places in Laurens County, South Carolina
1861 establishments in South Carolina